United Nations Security Council Resolution 427, adopted on May 3, 1978, after considering a letter by the Secretary-General, the council decided to increase the strength of the United Nations Interim Force in Lebanon (UNIFIL) from 4,000 to 6,000 troops.

While noting that some Israeli troops had withdrawn from Lebanon, it asked Israel to complete its withdrawal without further delay. The resolution went on to condemn all attacks by both parties on the UNIFIL peacekeeping force and demanded respect for the force. The decision came in the aftermath of the 1978 South Lebanon conflict during Lebanese Civil War.

The resolution was adopted by 12 votes to none; Czechoslovakia and the Soviet Union abstained while the People's Republic of China did not participate in voting.

See also
 Palestinian insurgency in South Lebanon
 Blue Line
 History of Lebanon
 List of United Nations Security Council Resolutions 401 to 500 (1976–1982)

References

External links
 
Text of the Resolution at undocs.org

 0427
Palestinian insurgency in South Lebanon
 0427
Lebanese Civil War
 0427
May 1978 events